Leopold Caro (1864–1939) was a Polish economist and lawyer.

1864 births
1939 deaths
Lawyers from Lviv
People from the Kingdom of Galicia and Lodomeria
Members of the Lwów Scientific Society
20th-century Polish economists
University of Lviv alumni
19th-century Polish economists